Mianwali is a city in Punjab, Pakistan.

Mianwali may also refer to:
Mianwali District, a district of Punjab (Pakistan).
Mianwali Tehsil, a tehsil of district Mianwali.
Mianwali Airport, a airport in Pakistan.
Mianwali railway station, a railway station in Pakistan.

See also
Mianwali Bangla, a village in Sailkot, Pakistan.
Mian Wali Qureshian, a village in Punjab, Pakistan.